Billy the Kid's Gun Justice is a 1940 American Western film directed by Sam Newfield for Producers Releasing Corporation, and 3rd in PRC's Billy the Kid series.

Plot
Billy the Kid (Bob Steele) and his friends Jeff (Carleton Young) and Fuzzy (Al St. John) are ambushed in a cabin. When Jeff is wounded during their getaway, they decide to hide out at Jeff's uncle's ranch in Little Bend Valley. While traveling to the ranch, they see henchmen Ed (Charles King) and Buck (Rex Lease) accosting Ann Roberts (Louise Currie) and throwing her goods from her wagon. After Billy chases them off, Ann tells him that she and her father Tom (Forrest Taylor) had recently purchased a ranch and that someone is trying to run them off their land. Traveling with Ann to protect her, they learn that the ranch she and her father had purchased was the one owned by Jeff's uncle, but that they failed to purchase the water rights. Discovering that other ranchers in the area had also purchased lands without water rights, Billy also learns that land baron Cobb Allen (Al Ferguson) had maliciously dammed the only free water stream in the area in order to force the group of ranchers to purchase water rights, or default on their loans. Billy and Jeff fight Allen's henchmen at the barricade, and after subduing them they return the water flow to its original channel.

Cast
 Bob Steele as Billy the Kid
 Al St. John as Fuzzy Jones
 Louise Currie as Ann Roberts
 Carleton Young as Jeff Blanchard
 Charles King as Henchman Ed Baker
 Rex Lease as Henchman Buck
 Kenne Duncan as Henchman Bragg
 Forrest Taylor as Tom Roberts
 Ted Adams as 2nd Sheriff
 Al Ferguson as Cobb Allen
 Karl Hackett as Attorney Martin
 Edward Peil Sr. as Dave Barlow
 Julian Rivero as Carlos
 Blanca Vischer as Juanita

Reception

See also
The "Billy the Kid" films starring Bob Steele:
 Billy the Kid Outlawed (1940)
 Billy the Kid in Texas (1940)
 Billy the Kid's Gun Justice (1940)
 Billy the Kid's Range War (1941)
 Billy the Kid's Fighting Pals (1941)
 Billy the Kid in Santa Fe (1941)

References

External links
 
 

1940 films
1940 Western (genre) films
American Western (genre) films
American black-and-white films
Billy the Kid (film series)
Films directed by Sam Newfield
1940s English-language films
1940s American films